Clarence Charles "Pint" Isreal (February 15, 1918 – April 12, 1987) was an American Negro league baseball player.

A native of Marietta, Georgia, Isreal played for the Newark Eagles and Homestead Grays between 1940 and 1947, and served in the US Army during World War II. He died in Rockville, Maryland in 1987 at age 69.

On December 16, 2020, the MLB announced that it will recognize Negro league records, allowing Isreal's records to be recognized along with MLB statistics at the time.

References

External links
 and Seamheads

1918 births
1987 deaths
Newark Eagles players
Homestead Grays players
Baseball players from Marietta, Georgia
United States Army personnel of World War II
20th-century African-American sportspeople